Dr. H. Siegrist (born in 1869) was a Swiss footballer who played in the 1890s.

Football career
FC Basel was founded on 15 November 1893 and Dr. H. Siegrist joined the club a few weeks later during their 1893–94 season.

The first football match that the club held was in the Landhof on 10 December against the football team of the club RTV/Realschüler-Turnverein, a secondary school student gymnastics club. Siegrist played in this match. He scored his first goal for the club in the same game, the second goal of the match, as Basel won by two goals to nil.

Siegrist stayed with the club for three seasons and during this time he played 14 games for Basel scoring at least two goals.

Notes

Footnotes

References

Sources
 Rotblau: Jahrbuch Saison 2017/2018. Publisher: FC Basel Marketing AG. 
 Die ersten 125 Jahre. Publisher: Josef Zindel im Friedrich Reinhardt Verlag, Basel. 
 Verein "Basler Fussballarchiv" Homepage
(NB: Despite all efforts, the editors of these books and the authors in "Basler Fussballarchiv" have failed to be able to identify all the players, their date and place of birth or date and place of death, who played in the games during the early years of FC Basel)

FC Basel players
Swiss men's footballers
1869 births
Date of death missing
Association footballers not categorized by position